Magnetické vlny léčí is a Czech comedy film. It was released in 1965.

External links
 

1965 films
Czechoslovak comedy films
1965 comedy films
Czech comedy films
1960s Czech films